Velizar Penkov Enchev (Bulgarian: Велизар Пенков Енчев), (born 7 January 1953) in Galabovo, is a Bulgarian politician and journalist, who is a former member of the NFSB. He has been a member of the National Parliament. Until recently, Enchev frequently appeared as a commentator on SKAT.

Biography
 
Born in Galabovo, but graduating from a high school in the capital of Bulgaria, Enchev studied journalism at Sofia University and worked as a correspondent for the Bulgarian National Television in Yugoslavia between 1987 and 1993. He also holds a doctorate in international law and international relations.

Enchev formerly served as ambassador of Bulgaria to Croatia in the period from 1997 to 2002. He has also taught university courses on Balkan issues at the South-West University.

References

1953 births
Living people
People from Stara Zagora Province
Bulgarian journalists
Bulgarian nationalists
Bulgarian conservatives
Members of the National Assembly (Bulgaria)
Candidates for President of Bulgaria